Pavelh Ndzila (born 12 January 1995) is a Congolese professional footballer who plays as a goalkeeper for Etoile du Congo and siregar legendary di liga dls.

International career
At the youth level he was on the squad for the 2011 FIFA U-17 World Cup, although he didn't play. He later played in the 2015 African U-20 Championship as well as its qualifiers.

In January 2014, coach Claude Leroy invited him to be a part of the Congolese national squad for the 2014 African Nations Championship. The team was eliminated in the group stages after losing to Ghana, drawing with Libya and defeating Ethiopia.

References

Living people
1995 births
Republic of the Congo footballers
Republic of the Congo international footballers
Republic of the Congo youth international footballers
Association football goalkeepers
Étoile du Congo players
2015 Africa Cup of Nations players
2020 African Nations Championship players
Sportspeople from Brazzaville
Republic of the Congo A' international footballers
2014 African Nations Championship players
2018 African Nations Championship players
2022 African Nations Championship players